Oslo: Burning The Bridge To Nowhere is the seventh stand-up comedy album by American comedian Doug Stanhope. It was released on May 3, 2011 via Roadrunner Records. It was recorded live in Norway at a former sewing machine factory and Nazi World War II bunker in the Oslo borough of Grünerløkka on September 18, 2009. The album peaked at #1 on the US Billboard Comedy Albums chart and #2 on the Heatseekers Albums chart.

Track listing

Chart history

References

External links
 Doug Stanhope's Official website
 Roadrunner Records

2011 albums
Doug Stanhope albums
Roadrunner Records live albums
Live comedy albums
2010s comedy albums
Stand-up comedy albums
2010s spoken word albums
Spoken word albums by American artists